Georgeta Hurmuzachi-Dumitrescu (born 23 January 1936) is a retired Romanian artistic gymnast who represented Romania at the 1956 Olympic Games. She was a member of the team that won the first team Olympic medal for Romania.

References

1936 births
Living people
Gymnasts at the 1956 Summer Olympics
Romanian female artistic gymnasts
Olympic gymnasts of Romania
Olympic bronze medalists for Romania
Olympic medalists in gymnastics
Medalists at the 1956 Summer Olympics
20th-century Romanian women